Jorge Alberto Meyer Long is an Uruguayan diplomat, since  he is ambassador in Bern.

From  to  he was ambassador in Moscow, and as of November 27, 2007 he was concurrently accredited in Yerevan.
With residence in Moscow, Dr. Jorge Meyer Long, was Ambassador of Uruguay in Russia, Armenia, Ukraine and Kazakhstan. He was director of the prestigious Artigas Institute, which is the Diplomatic School of Uruguay. He has a PhD in International Relations from the University of the Republic (Uruguay). 
Jorge Meyer is a native of Nueva Helvecia and great-grandson of a Swiss.

References

Living people
Ambassadors of Uruguay to Russia
Ambassadors of Uruguay to Switzerland
1949 births